Lake Bull is a small lake  east of Lake Vanda in Wright Valley, Victoria Land. The name appears to have been applied in the 1960s, probably in association with nearby Bull Pass, or for physicist Colin Bull, for whom the pass is named.

References 

Lakes of Victoria Land
McMurdo Dry Valleys